Since the 2007 municipal reform, Erik Flyvholm from Venstre had been mayor of Lemvig Municipality. The municipality is a fairly strong area for parties of the blue bloc, having been the municipality, where the blue parties had received the 8th highest vote share in the 2019 Danish general elections.

In 3 of the 4 termssince the reform, Venstre had an absolute majority of seats. Despite a small decrease in their vote share for this election, Venstre maintained their absolute majority, by winning 11 of the 21 seats. Erik Flyvholm had therefore no implications as to continue as mayor.

It was later confirmed that Erik Flyvholm would continue for a 4th term as mayor. He also managed to get all parties to support him.

Electoral system
For elections to Danish municipalities, a number varying from 9 to 31 are chosen to be elected to the municipal council. The seats are then allocated using the D'Hondt method and a closed list proportional representation.
Lemvig Municipality had 21 seats in 2021

Unlike in Danish General Elections, in elections to municipal councils, electoral alliances are allowed.

Electoral alliances  

Electoral Alliance 1

Electoral Alliance 2

Electoral Alliance 3

Results

Notes

References 

Lemvig